DJs from Mars is an Italian DJ and production team. They are known for their mashups of popular songs turned into electronic dance music.

Background 
The project started in 2003 after the meeting of young producers Ruben , in Bliss Corporation, an Italian label famous for the project of Eiffel 65 in the late 1990s. Both of them were producing songs for the label under different nicknames. It was only after a few years and several tracks together that they initiated the common project "DJs from Mars".

With the help of their American manager Jason Nevins, DJs from Mars produced official remixes for multiple artists, including Sean Paul, Pitbull, Sophie Ellis Bextor, Dirty Vegas, Fragma, Ciara, Coolio, and Ennio Morricone.

In 2013, DJs from Mars were ranked in DJ Mags list of Top 100 DJs.

In 2015, they are featured as main characters in the Gillette advertising campaign “Shave Forth”.

Recognition 
Lady Gaga featured their bootlegs of "Metallica vs Lady Gaga" on Twitter. Their productions are frequently featured on YouTube, as well. The duo received over 10 million views on their channel, and reached the 100.000 fans mark on their Facebook fan page in May 2012.

DJ career 
Famous for wearing cardboard boxes on their heads while playing live, they performed at a number of night clubs and events over the world including Europe, USA, Brazil, Dominican Republic, Canada, and China. They opened for Tiesto in Atlantic City in March 2011. In 2022 they played at the Tomorrowland Mainstage.

Discography

Albums

2010
Alien Nation vol.1
Alien Nation vol.2
Bootfellas

2013
Bootzilla

2014
Bootzilla: Vol. 2

2015
Bootzilla: Vol. 3

2018
Bootzilla: Vol. 4

2022
Bootzilla: Vol. 5

Singles and EPs 
2003
 Non Dormo Più - (Bliss Corporation)
2004
 Open Sesame - (Movimental)
 Kipo Mambo (Mama Made a Disco Groove)
2007
 The Motherfucker - (GreenPark)
2008
 Who Gives A Fuck About Deejays - (The Dominion)
 Dirty Mary (My Name Is)
 Saturday Night On The Moon
2009
 Suono & Immagine
 Don't Give Up
 Revolution Radio - as db Pure vs. Djs From Mars
2010
 Luv 2 Like It - as Rico Bernasconi vs. Djs From Mars
 Club Bizarre - as Brooklyn Bounce vs. Djs From Mars
2011
 Sex Bass & Rock 'n' Roll 2k11 - Brooklyn Bounce vs. Djs From Mars
 Can't Come Home - as Picco vs. Djs From Mars
 Que Pasa - as Gabry Ponte + Djs From Mars + Bellani & Spada
2012
 Insane (In Da Brain) - as Djs From Mars featuring Fragma
 Phat Ass Drop (How To Produce A Club Track Today)
2013
 Rock'N'Roll
2014
 Welcome To The Darkside - as Djs From Mars vs. David Puentez
 Hardcore Vibes - as Djs From Mars vs. Picco
 Devil In My Brain - as Djs From Mars vs. Carnival featuring James F. Dini
 Unconditional Symphony -as Djs From Mars vs. The Urban Love
 The Night Rave Before Christmas EP
2015
 Raving Bad EP
2016
 Stronger - with Luca Testa featuring Becko
 Bootylicious EP
2017
 Decks & Drops & Rock'n'Roll
2018
 Somewhere Above The Clouds
 Gam Gam
 Christmas Pack
2019
 The Spring Break Bootleg Pack
 The Summer Bangerz EP
 The Unforgettable EP
2020
 Summer 2020 Bootleg Pack
 All I Want For Christmas Is Groove Bootleg Pack
2021
 Sunday Morning
 The Drop - with Tiësto, Rudeejay and Da Brozz
 Sunglasses At Night - as Djs From Mars featuring JD Davis
 Summer On Mars Bootleg Pack
2022
 Killing Me Softly - with Gabry Ponte
 Christmas In The Club Bootleg EP
2023
 It Doesn't Matter - with SMACK

DJ Magazine Top 100 DJs

References

External links 

DJ duos
Italian DJs
Italian musical duos
Italian electronic music groups
Living people
Ableton Live users
1979 births
Masked musicians
Electronic dance music duos
Remixers